Bible study or Biblical study may refer to:

 Biblical studies, the academic application of a set of diverse disciplines to the study of the Bible
 Bible study (Christianity), the study of the Bible by ordinary people as a personal religious or spiritual practice
 Religious education, the teaching of a particular religion and its varied aspects

See also

 Bible
 Bible Study Fellowship, an international Christian interdenominational fellowship
 Biblical criticism
 Biblical hermeneutics
 Biblical software
 Biblical theology
 Campus Bible Study, at the University of New South Wales
 Cell group
 Historical criticism
 Historical-grammatical method
 Lectio Divina 
 Study Bible
Bachelor of Biblical Studies
Diploma of Biblical Studies
Doctor of Biblical Studies
Carolina College of Biblical Studies
College of Biblical Studies, Houston, Texas, USA
Eteacher Group#The Israel Institute of Biblical Studies
Northeast Institute of Biblical and Theological Studies (New York, U.S.